Jean-François Landolphe (5 February 1747, Auxonne – 1825, Paris) was a French naval commander.

Life
In 1786 he was sent to the coast of Africa to set up trading posts. He was defeated by a British force in the action of 4 August 1800. He published his Memoires in 1823.

External links
Bulletin By Soci D'Tudes De La Provin Cambrai

1765 births
1825 deaths
French naval commanders of the Napoleonic Wars
French Navy officers
French slave traders